Ica (Quechua: Ika) is a city and the capital of the Department of Ica in southern Peru. While the area was long inhabited by varying cultures of indigenous peoples, the Spanish conquistador Jerónimo Luis de Cabrera claimed its founding in 1563.

As of the 2017 census, it had a population of over 282,407. The city suffered extensive damage and loss of life during the 2007 Peru earthquake.

Geography 
Further south along the Pan-American Highway lies the city of Nazca.

Climate 

Ica lies on the border of the Atacama desert and has one of the driest climates in the world Köppen BWh, with only around 1 centimetre of rainfall for the whole year. Temperatures are hot during the summer months (December – March) and warm through the winter months (June – September).

History 

In 2007, researchers found the fossil remains of a prehistoric penguin, Icadyptes salasi, which inhabited the Atacama Desert about 30 million years ago.

Evidence of prehistoric indigenous civilizations has been found in the nearby deserts, such as that of Paracas.  Other cultures include the Chincha and the Inca, the latter of whom ruled this area beginning in the 14th century. Numerous pre-Columbian archeological artifacts are now displayed in the Museo Regional de Ica.

The Inca were still in power when the Spanish conquistadors invaded the territory. The Spanish colonial city was founded on 17 June 1563 by Gerónimo Luis de Cabrera as Villa de Valverde. It was ruled by Spain under colonial rulers until Peru achieved independence in 1821.

On 15 August 2007, a magnitude 8.0 earthquake occurred off the coast of Peru, severely damaging buildings, houses and infrastructure in Ica. Initially 17 people died and 70 were killed when a church collapsed. Pisco was even more severely damaged and many people were buried under buildings that had collapsed. Some 80% of the city's buildings were destroyed.

Transportation 

The Tren de la Costa is planned.

Tourism

Ica and surrounding areas are the traditional source of Pisco brandy. Ica is the site of the Museo Regional de Ica, a regional museum with exhibits ranging from prehistoric artifacts to the Spanish colonial era. On display are pre-Columbian funerary bundles and mummies. The elongated skulls from the Paracas and pre-Inca cultures suggest ritual deformation, perhaps to mark an elite class. Some skulls also bear evidence of trepanning, a kind of early brain surgery to relieve internal pressure or remove damaged skull matter suffered in battle.

A collection of furniture, paintings and artifacts date from the Spanish colonial era.

The Department of Ica encompasses considerable desert, giving it unique opportunities for tourism. The nearby Huacachina oasis is located in the midst of sand dunes. The city of Ica attracts international travelers, as well as resort seekers from Peru. Some young visitors try sandboarding; others travel the dunes in sand buggies.

Agriculture 
The many days of sunshine have made Ica the center of an important agricultural region.  Commodity crops are cotton, grapes, asparagus, avocado, mango, olives and other produce. It is known by Peruvians as the "Land of Eternal Sun".

Although the area has four seasons, the climate is warm and dry. Visitors say that it feels like a northern summer year-round. The climate of the city can help in easing asthma, which is aggravated by damp and humid climates and their associated allergens.

The desert city has drawn water for domestic and agricultural needs from an aquifer fed by glacial melt water. The regional usage is exceeding the inflow of water into the aquifer.  Because the aquifer is quickly drying up, activists have called for more efficient irrigation, or adding dams and water diversions.

See also
Ica stones
Irrigation in Peru
Administrative divisions of Peru

References

External links

Ica and the Huacachina Oasis , Trekker
"History of Peru, Ica", TampoPampa
Museo Regional de Ica Website

Populated places in the Ica Region
Populated places established in 1563
Cities in Peru
1563 establishments in the Viceroyalty of Peru
Regional capital cities in Peru